The Tarka Line, also known as the North Devon Line, is a local railway line in Devon, England, linking the city of Exeter with the town of Barnstaple via a number of local villages, operated by Great Western Railway (GWR). The line opened in 1851 from Exeter to Crediton and in 1854 the line was completed through to Barnstaple. The line was taken over by the London and South Western Railway (LSWR) in 1865 and later became part of the Southern Railway and then British Rail. In 2001, following privatisation, Wessex Trains introduced the name Tarka Line after the eponymous character in Henry Williamson's book Tarka the Otter. The line was transferred to First Great Western in 2006.

It is one of the railway lines supported by the Devon and Cornwall Rail Partnership and passenger numbers on the line have more than tripled since 2001.

History

Background and construction 

The first proposals relating to what would become the Tarka Line originated in the 1820s, when it was proposed that a railway line might be built from Crediton to Exeter Quay. Authority was obtained to build this line by an Act of 1831, but construction never started and the powers lapsed. However, business interests in Crediton became interested in a railway again after allies of the Great Western Railway (GWR), the Bristol and Exeter Railway (B&ER), reached Exeter in 1844, and the GWR-allied South Devon Railway started extending that line to Plymouth. In 1844, the Exeter and Crediton Railway (E&CR) was formed and a proposal was put forward for a new line to connect Crediton to the B&ER. This proposal was accepted and authority was granted by an Act of 1845. The new company had capital of £70,000 (around £8.5 million in modern money), and made arrangements with the B&ER for the latter's trains to run to Crediton along the former's tracks.

Meanwhile, a proposal from business interests in Barnstaple was put forward in 1845 to build a new line connecting their town to the B&ER at Exeter. However, these proposals were rejected by the Railway Commission under Lord Dalhousie, the so-called "Five Kings", who wished to defer the decision on linking Barnstaple to the national railway network in order to appraise an alternative proposal by the B&ER to construct a line that would run between Barnstaple and their station at Tiverton.

By January 1846, construction had started on the E&CR and on an unrelated line connecting Barnstaple with Fremington Quay, five miles to the west, and this created a new sense of urgency in connecting Barnstaple to the national network. Two proposals to reach Barnstaple were put forwards: an east-west route from Tiverton to Bideford, via Mid Devon and Barnstaple; and a north-south route from Barnstaple to Crediton (with access to Exeter along the E&CR). The Tiverton option had Isambard Kingdom Brunel as its engineer, was favoured by the GWR, and had backing from the Five Kings and the Lord Lieutenant of Devonshire, Hugh Fortescue, 2nd Earl Fortescue. Meanwhile, the LSWR had long-term ambitions to challenge the GWR's dominance in the south-west, and they backed the rival Crediton option, installing John Locke as its engineer.

The GWR party failed to submit their plans in line with the standing orders, and so Parliament rejected them, authorising the Crediton route despite the recommendations of Dalhousie's commission and the preference of the Lord Lieutenant. This Act of 1846 created the LSWR-allied Taw Vale Extension Railway (TVER). In 1847, the GWR party tried and failed to agree a lease of the TVER's line to the B&ER. In the same year, the LSWR party purchased a majority stake in the E&CR and then leased the E&CR line to the TVER. The E&CR board, led by a J.W. Buller, remained aligned to the B&ER until Buller was removed that year (amid a procedural controversy that resulted in an unsuccessful appeal to the Five Kings). At the same time, construction continued on the E&CR, and by the end of 1847, the line was complete except for a connection to the B&ER. Given the departure of Buller, the E&CR directors conceded that an agreement with the B&ER would be impossible and ordered that the line be converted to the LSWR's narrow gauge and a station be constructed at Cowley Bridge.

As for the TVER, the end of Railway Mania had left it without funding and the Act of 1846 had left the decision on its gauge to the Railway Commission, who in 1848 announced it would be in broad gauge. Four days later, the conversion of the E&CR was complete. Thus, in 1848, construction had not yet started on the Crediton to Barnstaple line, there was no capital available, and it would have to be constructed in a gauge that would make through trains to Exeter impossible. Meanwhile, the Commission also told the LSWR that they would not be permitted to construct a line linking the Cowley Bridge to Exeter, leaving the E&CR completely isolated.

Nineteenth century 

The deadlock was broken in 1851 by William Chapman, chairman of the LSWR and the E&CR. He agreed to convert one of the two tracks on the Crediton line to broad gauge and lease the line to B&ER; in exchange, the B&ER agreed to construct a junction allowing trains to run from Crediton to Exeter St Davids, and Cowley Bridge station was never opened.

In the same year, new company the North Devon Railway (NDR) was formed to replace the financially failed TVER and construction started on the Crediton–Barnstaple section. However, the track south of Crediton continued to be owned by the E&CR. The NDR was taken over by the London and South Western Railway (LSWR) in 1865, and while the E&CR remained nominally independent, the majority of its shares were owned by the LSWR and the B&ER. The section south of Crediton became part of the LSWR in 1876.

Twentieth century 
Following the passage of the Railways Act 1921, the LSWR was merged into the Southern Railway, and in 1948 this became the Southern Region of British Rail. Along with the LSWR line to Plymouth, the route was part of the "withered arm" of Southern routes in predominantly Great Western Railway (and subsequently Western Region) territory.

Privatisation 

From 13 October 1996, services on the Tarka Line were operated by Wales & West (owned by Prism Rail) as part of heir franchise. National Express purchased Wales & West from Prism Rail in July 2000 and on 14 October 2001 rebranded Wales & West as Wessex Trains after the Strategic Rail Authority transferred the company's Welsh services to Wales and Borders.

Sponsored by the North Devon tourist board, Wessex Trains renamed unit 150241 to The Tarka Belle and changed its livery to advertising for tourist destinations on the Tarka Line.

The line was transferred to First Great Western in 2006, who rebranded as GWR in 2015 and introduced the line's current fleet and service pattern in December 2019.

Stations 

Crediton and  stations are both Listed grade II, as is an old railway warehouse outside Barnstaple station.

Services 

Since December 2019 most services have been operated by Great Western Railway  diesel multiple units. For several years before this they had been operated by s, which were transferred to other branch lines in Devon and Cornwall, and s which were withdrawn. They operate approximately hourly and take around 75 minutes for the journey between Exeter Central and Barnstaple.

Operation 

The line is single track with passing loops at Crediton and Eggesford. The only signal box is at Crediton. Its semaphore signals and mechanical lever frame were replaced by electric signals and an electric signalling panel on 16 December 1984. Trains between Crediton and Barnstaple are controlled by tokens which ensure there is just one train on the line at any time. Train drivers exchange their token in the No Signalman Token Remote (NSTR) equipment at Eggesford.

Community rail 

The Tarka Line is named after the otter in Henry Williamson's book Tarka the Otter which is set in the area. It is one of the railway lines supported by the Devon and Cornwall Rail Partnership, an organisation formed in 1991 to promote railway services in the area.  The line is promoted by many means such as regular timetable and scenic line guides, as well as leaflets highlighting leisure opportunities such as walking or visiting country pubs.

The Tarka Line rail ale trail was launched in 2002, the first of several such schemes which encourages rail travellers to visit pubs near the line.  The trail originally covered 16 pubs, and the number has risen and fallen over the years, but in 2020 is 11 pubs. There are three pubs in Exeter and five in Barnstaple, with one each at Lapford, Portsmouth Arms, and Umberleigh. 10 stamps collected in the Rail Ale Trail leaflet entitle the participant to claim special Tarka Line Rail Trail souvenir tour shirt.

Wessex Trains covered Class 150 2-car DMU number 150241 in coloured pictures promoting the line and named The Tarka Belle. It is still in service with Great Western Railway (Formerly First Great Western) but is no longer in that livery.

The line was designated by the Department for Transport as a community rail line in September 2006.  This aims to increase revenue and reduce costs.  Among possible options are increasing the car parking at stations, looking at ways to increase the train frequency and facilities at stations.

Proposed improvements 
Network Rail would like to raise the Cowley Bridge during their Control Period 7 (2024-2029). This would reduce the likelihood of the railway being closed or damaged by floods.

The Barnstaple to Bideford route was mentioned in the Association of Train Operating Companies  2009 Connecting Communities: Expanding Access to the Rail Network report which recommended some closed lines that could be rebuilt to restore railway services to large communities.

See also
Tarka Trail
West of England Main Line

References

 Department for Transport, Rail Group (2006), Route prospectus for the ... Tarka Line'

External links

Tarka Rail Association

Rail transport in Devon
Scenic railway lines in Devon and Cornwall
Community railway lines in England
Transport in Exeter
Railway lines in South West England
Standard gauge railways in England